Harvard H. Ellis Technical High School, or Ellis Tech, is a technical high school located in Danielson, Connecticut. It is part of the Connecticut Technical High School System. Founded in 1916 as the Putnam Trade School, it was the first technical school in Connecticut to have its own building. It is in the Connecticut Technical High School System. It receives students from many nearby towns.

The current school building was constructed in 2014. The building underwent renovations to add 30,000 square feet of new floor space as well as a new gymnasium, a classroom wing, a media center, and a culinary arts program space.

Technologies
In addition to a complete academic program leading to a high school diploma, students attending Ellis Tech receive training in one of the following trades and technologies:

Automotive Collision Repair
Automotive
Carpentry
Culinary Arts
Electrical
Electronics
Hairdressing and Cosmetology
Machine tool
Masonry
Plumbing and Heating
Sustainable architecture

Athletics 
Fall Sports:
Cross Country
Football
Soccer
Volleyball
Winter Sports:
Boys' and Girls' Basketball
Wrestling
Spring Sports:
Baseball
Golf
Softball
Track & Field

References

External links 
 

Schools in Windham County, Connecticut
Public high schools in Connecticut